Back with the Thugz is the thirteenth solo album by the rapper Bizzy Bone, released on Hi-Power Entertainment.

Track listing

"Bone Unity Report"
"Back With The Thugz"
"Shooting At Me" (featuring Mr. Capone-E)
"Race Against Time" (featuring Bad Azz)
"The Process"
"I Wanna Sing"
"On That Natural High" (Produced by NuNation Productions)
"Thats Why Thugs Never Cry" (Produced by NuNation Productions)
"Let's Get High" (featuring Snoop Dogg, Malow Mac & Miss Lady Pinks) (Produced by NuNation Productions)
"Jockin' Bizzy"
"Women Keep Watching Us"
"End of This World"
"Is There Anything Left 2 Deal With"
"Bone Thug Boyz" (Bonus) (featuring Bone Thugs-n-Harmony)
"Ready For Anything" (Bonus) (featuring Southern Kappin' Soldiers)
"Outro"

References

2009 albums
Bizzy Bone albums